Arthur Harrison Cole (November 21, 1889 – November 10, 1974) was an American economic historian and was the head of the Harvard University Business School's library.  Cole created the Research Center in Entrepreneurial History that was addressed by Joseph Schumpeter, and that had as participants several graduate students who later went on to distinguished careers in economic history.

He graduated from Bowdoin College and Harvard University.

References

1889 births
1974 deaths
20th-century American historians
20th-century American male writers
Harvard University faculty
Bowdoin College alumni
Harvard University alumni
Harvard Business School people
Harvard University staff
American male non-fiction writers